The Fowler Apartments, located at 430 W. McIntosh St. in Milledgeville, Georgia, were built in 1930.  They were listed on the National Register of Historic Places in 1997.

They were built as upscale apartments.

References

National Register of Historic Places in Georgia (U.S. state)
Colonial Revival architecture in Georgia (U.S. state)
Residential buildings completed in 1930
Baldwin County, Georgia